Gender transition is the process of changing one's gender presentation or sex characteristics to accord with one's internal sense of gender identity – the idea of what it means to be a man or a woman, or to be non-binary or genderqueer. For transgender and transsexual people, this process commonly involves reassignment therapy (which may include hormone replacement therapy and sex reassignment surgery), with their gender identity being opposite that of their birth-assigned sex and gender. Transitioning might involve medical treatment, but it does not always involve it. Cross-dressers, drag queens, and drag kings tend not to transition, since their variant gender presentations are (usually) only adopted temporarily.

Transition begins with a decision to transition, prompted by the feeling that one's gender identity does not match the sex that one was assigned at birth. One of the most common parts of transitioning is coming out for the first time. Transitioning is a process that can take anywhere between several months and several years. Some people, especially non-binary or genderqueer people, may spend their whole life transitioning and may redefine and re-interpret their gender as time passes. Transitioning generally begins where the person feels comfortable: for some, this begins with their family with whom they are intimate and reaches to friends later or may begin with friends first and family later. Sometimes transitioning is at different stages between different spheres of life. For example, someone may transition far with family and friends before even coming out at their workplace.

Terminology
Gender transition is sometimes conflated with sex reassignment surgery (SRS), but that is only one possible element of transition. Many people who transition choose not to have SRS, or do not have the means to do so. Whereas SRS is a surgical procedure, transitioning is more holistic and usually includes physical, psychological, social, and emotional changes. Some transgender and non-binary people have little or no desire to undergo surgery to change their body but will transition in other ways.

Passing refers to being perceived and accepted by other people in a manner consistent with one's own gender identity. This can be one aspect of transitioning, though some transgender people may choose to purposely not pass. Not passing, in this case, can bring about a variety of negative consequences, including misgendering, violence, abuse, and refusal from medical professionals to deliver appropriate services.

Going full-time refers to a person living one's everyday life as the gender one identifies with. One's passing can be limited by safety, legal or bodily restraints. For instance, someone who has worked at a job as female may feel they cannot safely present as male and may switch jobs instead. A social transition is the aspects of transition involving social, cosmetic, and legal changes, without regard to medical interventions. People who socially transition may ask others to refer to them by their preferred name and pronouns, and some may legally change their name. Mental health professionals who go by the World Professional Association for Transgender Health (WPATH) Standards of Care for the Health of Transsexual, Transgender, and Gender Nonconforming People do not normally require a patient to go full-time for at least a year (a period of time generally referred to as the "real-life experience" or "real-life test", but mental health professionals who do not adhere to these guidelines do before recommending surgery.

Going stealth means to live as a gender without other people realizing a person is transgender. Trans people often go stealth in public but not with family, partners, or intimate friends. There have been many cases of people who have lived and worked as a gender identity different from their gender assigned at birth.

Detransitioning is the process of changing one's gender presentation and/or sex characteristics back to accord with one's assigned sex. Detransitioning has also been called retransitioning, though retransitioning can also mean transitioning again after detransitioning.

Various aspects
Transitioning is a complicated process that involves any or all of the gendered aspects of a person's life, which include aesthetics, social roles, legal status, and biological aspects of the body. People may choose elements based on their own gender identity, body image, personality, finances, and sometimes the attitudes of others. A degree of experimentation is used to know what changes best fit them. Transitioning also varies between cultures and subcultures according to differences in the societies' views of gender.

Social, psychological, and aesthetic aspects

The social process of transitioning begins with coming out, that is, informing other individuals that one identifies as transgender. From there, the newly out trans person may adopt a new name, and they may ask others to refer to them using a set of pronouns different from before; for example, a trans man would ask to be referred to as he rather than she, or a genderqueer/non-binary person might ask to be referred to as they or by "gender-bending" pronouns such as ze. Personal relationships often take on different dynamics in accordance with gender; what was once an opposite-gender relationship is now a same-gender one, and vice versa. Gender roles and social expectations often change as the transition progresses. Aesthetics and fashion are also a common consideration for transitioning. Transitioning people often alter what types of clothing and accessories they wear, have their hair styled differently, and adopt new grooming or makeup techniques to enhance their appearance.

A person's ideas about gender in general also often changes as part of their transition, which may affect their religious, philosophical and/or political beliefs.

Legal aspects

Transgender people in many parts of the world can legally change their name to something consistent with their gender identity. Some regions also allow one's legal sex marker changed on documents such as driver licenses, birth certificates, and passports. The exact requirements vary from jurisdiction to jurisdiction; some require sex reassignment surgery, while many do not. In addition, some states that require sex reassignment surgery will only accept "bottom surgery", or a genital reconstruction surgery, as a valid form of sex reassignment surgery, while other states allow other forms of gender confirmation surgery to qualify individuals for changing information on their birth certificates. In some U.S. states, it is also possible for transgender individuals to legally change their gender on their drivers license without having had any form of qualifying gender confirmation surgery. Also, some U.S. states are beginning to add the option of legally changing one's gender marker to X on legal documents, an option used by some non-binary people.

Physical aspects

Physical aspects of gender transition can go along with social aspects; as well as wearing gender affirming clothing, transgender people often hide features from their natal puberty, with many transgender men binding their breasts and transgender women shaving. Other physical aspects of transitioning require medical intervention, such as transgender hormone therapy or surgeries.

Grieving gender identity 
Over the course of a gender transition, people who are close to the transitioning individual may experience a sense of loss, and work through a grieving process. This type of loss is an ambiguous loss, characterized by feelings of grief where the item of loss is obscure. Family members may grieve for the gendered expectations their loved one will no longer follow, whereas the transgender person themself may feel rejected by their relatives need to grieve. Feelings that arise are described as a way of seeing the person who is transitioning as the same, but different, or both present and absent.

See also

 List of transgender-related topics

References

Further reading
 

 
Minimum ages